The first 1798 United States Senate special election in New York was held on January 11, 1798, by the New York State Legislature to elect a U.S. Senator (Class 1) to represent the State of New York in the United States Senate.

Background
Federalist Philip Schuyler was elected in 1797, and resigned on January 3, 1798, because of ill health.

At the State election in April 1797, Federalist majorities were elected to both houses of the 21st New York State Legislature which met from January 2 to April 6, 1798, at Albany, New York.

Candidates
New York Supreme Court Justice John Sloss Hobart was the candidate of the Federalist Party. 

State Senator John Addison, of Kingston, was the candidate of the Democratic-Republican Party.

John Armstrong, Judge John Tayler, State Senator James Watson, and Congressman James Cochran received "scattering" votes.

Result
Hobart was the choice of both the State Senate and the State Assembly, and was declared elected.

Aftermath
Hobart took his seat on February 2, but resigned on April 16, 1798, after his appointment to the United States District Court for the District of New York. William North was appointed by Governor John Jay to fill the vacancy temporarily, and took his seat on May 21, Congress being in session until July 16, 1798. The next State Legislature met in August 1798, and elected James Watson over John Tayler to serve for the remainder of the term.

See also
1798 United States Senate special elections in New York
August 1798 United States Senate special election in New York

References
The New York Civil List compiled in 1858 (see: pg. 62 for U.S. Senators; pg. 116 for State Senators 1797-98; page 171 for Members of Assembly 1797-98) [gives election date as "January 11"]
Members of the Fifth United States Congress
History of Political Parties in the State of New-York by Jabez Delano Hammond (pages 110f) [gives election date as "12th of January"]
Election result at Tufts University Library project "A New Nation Votes" [quotes Assembly Journal with date "January 11th"]

1798 01 Special
New York 1798 01
New York Special 01
United States Senate Special 01
United States Senate 1798 01
New York 1798 01